The Sound of Silence is a 2019 American drama film directed by Michael Tyburski. It was screened in the U.S. Dramatic Competition section at the 2019 Sundance Film Festival. The plot centers on Peter Lucian, played by Peter Sarsgaard, a "house tuner," working on the sonic environment of homes. It is based on the director's 2013 short film "Palimpsest". It was released on September 13, 2019, by IFC Films.

Cast
 Rashida Jones as Ellen Chasen
 Peter Sarsgaard as Peter Lucian
 Tony Revolori as Samuel Diaz
 Austin Pendleton as Robert Feinway
 Kate Lyn Sheil as Nancy
 Alex Karpovsky as Landon
 Bruce Altman as Harold Carlyle
 Tina Benko as Dr. Elizabeth Brookings
Alison Fraser as Denise Feinway

References

External links
 

2019 films
2019 drama films
American drama films
IFC Films films
2010s English-language films
2010s American films